Irmela Broniecki (born 26 April 1944) is a German fencer. She competed in the women's individual and team foil events at the 1972 Summer Olympics.

References

External links
 

1944 births
Living people
German female fencers
Olympic fencers of West Germany
Fencers at the 1972 Summer Olympics
People from Speyer
Sportspeople from Rhineland-Palatinate